Redlands is an unincorporated community and census-designated place (CDP) located in and governed by Mesa County, Colorado, United States. It is part of the Grand Junction, CO Metropolitan Statistical Area. The population of the Redlands CDP was 9,061 at the 2020 census. The Grand Junction post office (ZIP Code 81507) serves the area.

Geography
Redlands is in central Mesa County, lying on the southwest side of the Colorado River between the city of Grand Junction to the east and the city of Fruita to the northwest.

Demographics

See also

Outline of Colorado
Index of Colorado-related articles
State of Colorado
Colorado cities and towns
Colorado census designated places
Colorado counties
Mesa County, Colorado
List of statistical areas in Colorado
Grand Junction, CO Metropolitan Statistical Area

References

External links

Mesa County website

Census-designated places in Mesa County, Colorado
Census-designated places in Colorado